Thornhill is a surname. Notable people with the surname include:

Alan Thornhill (born 1921), British sculptor
Arthur Thornhill (1850–1930), English politician
Batt Thornhill, Irish sportsperson
Charles Thornhill (1814–1881), English cricketer
Claude Thornhill (1909–1965), American pianist, arranger and bandleader
Claude E. Thornhill (1893–1956), American college football player and coach
Dorothy Thornhill (born 26 May 1955), British politician, Mayor of Watford
Frederick Thornhill (1846–1876), English cricketer
George Thornhill (MP) (1783–1852), English member of parliament
George Thornhill (cricketer) (1811–1875), English cricketer
James Thornhill (1675/6–1734), English painter
Juan Thornhill (born 1996), American football player
Leeroy Thornhill (born 1969), British electronic music artist
Leonard W. Thornhill (1915–1942), American World War II Naval officer and pilot
Lisa Thornhill (born 1962), American actress
Matt Thornhill (born 1988), English footballer
Michael Thornhill (1941–2022), Australian film producer, screenwriter, and director
Nina Thornhill (born 1953), British chemical engineer
Pauline Thornhill, host and producer of Canadian Broadcasting Corporation's longest running regional television program, Land and Sea
Roland Thornhill (born 1935), Canadian politician
Siri Thornhill, Norwegian soprano
Thomas Thornhill (1837–1900), British politician
Tom Thornhill (born 1952), American lawyer and politician
William Thornhill (c. 1500 – 1557), English politician
William Pole Thornhill (1807–1876), English politician and landowner

Fictitious
Roger O. Thornhill, character played by Cary Grant in North by Northwest
Ernest Thornhill, alias of The Machine in Person of Interest (TV series)

English-language surnames
English toponymic surnames
Surnames of English origin